Guoguang Laboratory School, National Sun Yat-sen University (GGSH or KKSH) is an affiliated school of National Sun Yat-sen University located in Nanzih District, Kaohsiung, Taiwan.

See also
 Oil Refinery Elementary School Station
 National Sun Yat-sen University
 CPC Corporation
 Secondary education in Taiwan

External links
School's website

Schools in Kaohsiung
High schools in Taiwan
1959 establishments in Taiwan